Silverton Partners is an early-stage venture capital firm headquartered in Austin, Texas.

Founded in 2006, Silverton Partners focuses on the Seed and Series A rounds of a startup's lifecycle across a variety of industries including enterprise SaaS, cybersecurity, consumer marketplaces, financial services, insurance, real estate technologies, digital healthcare, etc. Silverton Partners is the longest running venture firm in Texas and has been named the most active venture capital firm in Texas for the seventh consecutive year by CBInsights.

History
Silverton Partners was founded by Bill Wood, a founder of Austin Ventures, in 2005. After initially operating as a family office, Silverton Partners launched Fund III as an institutional fund with $75 million in 2006, Fund IV with $75 million in 2013, and Fund V with $108 million in 2018.

The firm is led by Managing Partner, Morgan Flager, and Partners, Kip McClanahan, Mike Dodd, and Roger Chen. In 2021, Silverton Partners’ Morgan Flager and Mike Dodd were both named on Seed 100, Business Insider’s list of the most prominent seed investors in the U.S.

In 2021, Silverton Partners was named the most active venture capital firm in Texas for the seventh consecutive year by CBInsights.

Portfolio
Among Silverton’s early-stage investments are:

 360pi
 Aceable
 Apprentice.io
 Billie
 BlackLocus
 Convey
 Convio
 Outbound Engine
 Rollick
 SailPoint
 SelfLender
 Silicon Laboratories
 SourceDay
 SpareFoot
 The Zebra
 Tivoli Software
 TrendKite
 Turnkey Vacation Rentals
 UnboundID
 uShip
 WP Engine

References

External links 
 

Venture capital firms of the United States
Companies based in Austin, Texas
American companies established in 2005
2005 establishments in Texas